Mayors in New Zealand are the highest-ranking officer in a territorial authority in New Zealand. Mayors are now elected at large, i.e. the role is contested by public vote across a whole district or city. Historically, city or town councillors elected one of their own as mayor, or chairman. Mayors are elected during the triennial local body elections.

"Mayor" is from the Latin māior and means "greater".

See also
 Elections in New Zealand
 Mayor–council government

References